Aasta Voss (October 26, 1914 – May 29, 1994) was a Norwegian actress.

Voss made her debut in 1935 as Georgine in Oskar Braaten's  (The Great Baptism) at the Norwegian Theater, where she was later employed, except for two short stays at the Rogaland Theater and the National Traveling Theater. With a sharply realistic feeling, Voss played a number of female roles in Braaten's plays, Nastja in Maxim Gorky's The Lower Depths, Mrs. Buch in Helge Krog's adaptation of Cora Sandel's  (Krane's Café), and Indiana in Olav Duun's  (Fellow Man). She also proved to be a confident stylistic artist, including in Federico García Lorca's Yerma and in Bertolt Brecht's The Caucasian Chalk Circle and The Good Person of Szechwan, and in pantomime style in Eugene O'Neill's The Emperor Jones.

She made her film debut as Josefine in Bør Børson Jr. (1938), followed by the role of Inga in Godvakker-Maren (1940) as well as several major and minor supporting roles.

Filmography
1938: Bør Børson Jr. as Josefine
1940: Godvakker-Maren as Inga
1940: Tørres Snørtevold as Betha
1951: Kranes konditori as Mrs. Buch
1952: Trine!
1958: I slik en natt
1960: Veien tilbake as Mrs. Arbin

References

External links
 
 Aasta Voss at the Swedish Film Database
 Aasta Voss at Filmfront

1914 births
1994 deaths
20th-century Norwegian actresses
Norwegian stage actresses
Norwegian film actresses
People from Volda